The 2019–20 Maltese Premier League was the 105th season of the Maltese Premier League, the top-flight league football in Malta. The fixtures were announced on 2 July 2019; the season started on 23 August 2019 and was scheduled to conclude on 25 April 2020. Valletta were the defending champions, having won their 25th title the previous season.

On 12 March 2020, due to the outbreak of the COVID-19 pandemic in Malta, a decision was made by the Malta Football Association (MFA) to suspend all football activities in Malta for ten days, after initially agreeing for football matches to be played behind closed doors. This suspension was further extended on 17 March to last until 5 April, and then suspended indefinitely on 30 March. On 18 May, the MFA Executive Committee decided to prematurely terminate the league competition and the ongoing FA Trophy competition. On 25 May, Floriana were awarded the championship after a vote taken by the MFA council, their 26th title and level with Sliema Wanderers in the all-time champions list. Floriana topped the standings with 41 points at the time the league was halted. Valletta, Hibernians and Sirens were awarded the three UEFA Europa League spots based on sporting merits. Furthermore, relegation was scrapped across all leagues even if there was mathematic certainty.

Effects of the COVID-19 pandemic 

The league season has been affected by the COVID-19 pandemic since March. Valletta, Birkirkara and Gżira United proposed to the Malta Football Association that the league is not to be cancelled but resumes in June for training and in July when the first matches are to be played. These suggestions were dismissed by the Superintendent for Public Health, Charmaine Gauci, emphasizing that measures will only be lifted once the situation stabilizes. Eventually, the three clubs wrote to the Prime Minister of Malta Robert Abela to either resume the competition or cancel any sport until a vaccine is found.

On 25 May 2020, upon the assigning of the league title to Floriana, spontaneous celebrations cropped up in the town's main square. This was later ended by the Malta Police Force due to social distancing measures still being in place, although some reports argued that this was not timely. This celebration was later decried by the public and local entities. The Superintendent of Public Health recommended that all those who attended the celebration get tested; a day after this appeal a surge in phonecalls on the COVID-19 helpline was reported related with this event. The police force started an investigation on the matter.

Tarxien Rainbows, who gathered four points in 20 matches and were already mathematically relegated by 8 March 2020, kept their place in next season's top tier after it was agreed that relegations would be scrapped. The vote passed by the MFA council scrapped relegation to avoid an odd number in the following season and therefore avoid weekly byes.

Teams 

Fourteen teams will compete in the league – the top eleven teams from the previous season and three teams promoted from the First Division. The promoted teams are Sirens, Gudja United and St. Lucia who will be playing their first season in the top division. They replace Qormi, Pietà Hotspurs (both teams relegated after one season back in the league) and St. Andrews, the latter losing the relegation play-off against St. Lucia to become the first Premier League side to lose this play-off against a First Division team.

Personnel and kits 

 Additionally, referee kits are made by Adidas, sponsored by TeamSports and FXDD.

Managerial changes

Venues

League table

Results

Positions by round 

The table lists the positions of teams after each week of matches. In order to preserve chronological evolvements, any postponed matches are not included to the round at which they were originally scheduled, but added to the full round they were played immediately afterwards.

Season statistics

Top goalscorers

Hat-tricks 

Notes
 Player scored 4 goals

Awards

Monthly awards

References

External links 
 Official website

Maltese Premier League seasons
Malta
1
Malta